Khairagarh State was one of the princely states of India during the period of the British Raj. Khairagarh town in Khairagarh-Chhuikhadan-Gandai district of Chhattisgarh was the capital of the state and the see of the Raja's residence.

History
Khairagarh State was a feudatory state of the former Central Provinces of British India. The chief, who was descended from royal family of the old Nagvanshis of Chotanagpur, received the title of Raja as a hereditary distinction in 1898 or on 1st January 1896. The Khairagarh chiefs claimed descent from the prominent Rajgond dynasty of Garha-Mandla.

The state included a fertile plain, yielding rice. Khairagarh was one of the states in Chhattisgarh affected by a severe famine in 1897-1898. "The demands of famine created an enormous export in food grains which affected even the remotest parts of Bastar and Kalahandi.  From the Khairagarh State alone 500,000 maunds of grain were exported."

The administration of the state was apparently effective and its wealth and importance were maintained. A review of the administration of the Central Provinces is as follows- "The high standard of administration which the Khairagarh State has for many past years maintained, no less than its wealth and importance, renders this permanent addition to its dignity and status peculiarly pleasing and appropriate."

The last ruler of Khairagarh, Birendra Bahadur Singh, signed the accession to the dominion of India on 1st January 1948.

Rulers
1833- Khairagarh estate (zamindari) founded.
1873 - 1893- British India administration.
1898- Khairagarh recognized as a state.
19 Feb 1891 -  7 Oct 1908  Kamal Narayan Singh (b. 1867 - d. 1908), personal style Raja from 1896, made hereditary 1898
8 Oct 1908 - 22 Oct 1918  Lal Bahadur Singh (b. 1889 - d. 1918)
8 Oct 1908 - 13 Dec 1912  Rai Sahib Sunder Lall (superintendent)
22 Oct 1918 - 15 Aug 1947  Birendra Bahadur Singh (b. 1914 - d. 1998)

See also 
 Eastern States Agency
 Chhattisgarh Division
Political integration of India

References

Princely states of India
States and territories disestablished in 1948
History of Chhattisgarh
Rajnandgaon district
1833 establishments in India
1948 disestablishments in India